Clyzomedus is a genus of longhorn beetles of the subfamily Lamiinae, containing the following species:

 Clyzomedus annularis Pascoe, 1866
 Clyzomedus borneensis Breuning, 1936
 Clyzomedus fastidiosus (Boisduval, 1835)
 Clyzomedus indicus Breuning, 1935
 Clyzomedus javanicus Breuning, 1963
 Clyzomedus laosensis Breuning, 1965
 Clyzomedus laosicus Breuning, 1963
 Clyzomedus transversefasciatus Breuning, 1938
 Clyzomedus vittaticollis Breuning, 1938

References

Mesosini